Sergey Lukashok (born 20 June 1958) is a retired Israeli discus thrower.

His personal best throw was 66.64 metres, achieved in September 1983 in Odessa, while representing the Soviet Union. After the dissolution of the Soviet Union he got Belorussian citizenship, but emigrated to Israel. He won the Israeli championship in 1993, 1994 and 1995. Internationally he represented his new country at the 1993 and 1995 World Championships, and finished eleventh at the 1994 European Championships.

See also
List of Maccabiah records in athletics

References

1958 births
Living people
Soviet male discus throwers
Israeli male discus throwers
Ukrainian emigrants to Israel